Penfield station is a SEPTA rapid transit station in Haverford Township, Pennsylvania. It serves the Norristown High Speed Line (Route 100) and is located at Manoa Road and Lawson Avenue. Both local trains and Norristown Express trains stop at Penfield.

Station layout

External links

 Manoa Road entrance from Google Maps Street View

SEPTA Norristown High Speed Line stations